Bismo is a town in and the administrative centre of Skjåk municipality in Innlandet county, Norway.

The Norwegian National Road 15 runs through the village. The lake Aursjoen lies on the mountain plateau just north of the village and the mountain Tverrfjellet lies just south of the village. Skjåk Church lies just east of the village.

Climate
Data for nearby Bråtå weather station. Bismo has a dry summer subarctic climate (Dsc). Spring and early summer are the driest time of year and fall and winter are the wettest. The coldest month, January, averages  while the warmest month, July, averages .

References

Skjåk
Villages in Innlandet